Ho Chung Kin (born 15 March 1938) is a Hong Kong sports shooter. He competed in the men's 25 metre rapid fire pistol event at the 1984 Summer Olympics.

References

External links
 

1938 births
Living people
Hong Kong male sport shooters
Olympic shooters of Hong Kong
Shooters at the 1984 Summer Olympics
Place of birth missing (living people)